Animac is the International Animation Film Festival of Catalonia, and is organised by the City Council of Lleida and the Regional Government of Catalonia.

It is a non-competitive festival that takes place in Lleida (Spain). It shows a selection of the best animation done all over the world.

It was created in 1996 to celebrate the hundredth anniversary of the cinema. But it appeared with a different name: Cinemagic 96, International Animation Film Festival, under the direction of Eladi Martos and Jordi Artigas. This first edition was promoted by Lleida’s Cultural Department and the local Fine Arts School, together with ASIFA Catalunya.

It is in 1997 when it takes the name of Animac, International Animation Film Festival, that changed still once more in 2006, into the definitive one: Animac, International Animation Film Festival of Catalonia.

In 2012 Animac will celebrate its 16th anniversary.

References

External links 
 Official website

Culture in Lleida
Film festivals in Catalonia
Animation film festivals
Recurring events established in 1996